Dr. Paul Wengert (born November 18, 1952 in Ellwangen) was the mayor of Füssen (1990-2002). From 2002-2008 he was the Mayor of Augsburg in the state of Bavaria in Germany. Since 2008 he is a member of the Landtag of Bavaria. He is a member of the Social Democratic Party.

In 2006 he was one of the finalists for World Mayor and finished in sixth place.

External links
World Mayor profile
Paul Wengert's official website (German)

Mayors of Augsburg
Social Democratic Party of Germany politicians
1952 births
Living people